Ignatz is a masculine given name.

Notable people with the given name 
 Ignatz Bubis (1927–1999), German Jewish leader and chairman of the Zentralrat der Juden in Deutschland from 1992 to 1999
 Ignatz Leo Nascher (1863–1944), Austrian-born, American medical doctor who coined the term "geriatrics" in 1909
 Ignatz Lichtenstein (1824–1909), Hungarian Orthodox rabbi who wrote pamphlets advocating conversion to Christianity
 Ignatz Urban (1848–1931), German botanist
 Ignatz von Popiel (1863–1941), Polish-Ukrainian chess player
 Ignatz Waghalter (1881–1949), Polish-German composer and conductor
Ignatz Wiemeler (1895–1952), German bookbinder

Fictional characters 
 Ignatz, a central character in the comic strip Krazy Kat
 Ignatz Victor, from the game Fire Emblem: Three Houses

See also
 Ignaz
 Ignatz Award, for comics and cartooning
 Ignatz Series, international comic imprint
 Ignatius

Masculine given names
German masculine given names
Jewish masculine given names